Microbacterium ginsengiterrae is a Gram-positive, heterotrophic, strictly aerobic and non-motile bacterium from the genus Microbacterium which has been isolated from soil from a ginseng field in Korea.

References

External links
Type strain of Microbacterium ginsengiterrae at BacDive -  the Bacterial Diversity Metadatabase	

Bacteria described in 2010
ginsengiterrae